Eric Blackwood (born as Eric Pastore) is an American singer-songwriter, guitarist and musician with the progressive rock band Edison's Children. He is also an author, photographer, webmaster, special effects technician and property technician, and has been an honorary member of the Marillion touring crew since 2005.

Early life 
Blackwood was born in Brooklyn, New York, on 24 July 1968, the youngest of four siblings. He was raised in the Great Kills neighborhood of Staten Island, and graduated from New Dorp High School in 1986. Among his siblings are musician Sonny Pastore (of the band The Reluctant Reasons) and actor Garry Pastore. He's also the cousin of actor Vincent Pastore.

Career
Blackwood and Pete Trewavas (of Marillion and Transatlantic) first formed the progressive rock duo Edison's Children in 2008, and recorded the album In The Last Waking Moments..., released on 11 November 2011, by Random Disturbance Records, and distributed in Europe by Marillion's Racket Records. It spawned the U.S commercial radio Top 40 hit "A Million Miles Away (I Wish I Had A Time Machine)" on the FMQB Hot A/C Commercial Radio Charts on 18 September 2012, and remaining in the Top 40 for ten straight weeks, returning to its peak position at number 32 on 12 October 2012. In 2013 they released a second album, The Final Breath Before November, featuring drummer Henry Rogers. Rick Armstrong, the son of Neil Armstrong, joined Edison's Children as a synth guitarist, lead guitarist and bassist in Montreal in 2011. He stayed on as a permanent member, finishing up their third album, Somewhere Between Here and There, which included new mixes by King Crimson's Jakko Jakszyk of songs from The Final Breath Before November.

The song "At Night", penned during Blackwood's previous effort Blackwood and Foti and remixed by the band Closenuf, has received an Official Grammy Ballot Placement.

Blackwood collaborated with Trewavas on more than a hundred songs for films and for Edison's Children between 2008 and 2012, but stopped recording and performing in 2013 after an injury he suffered while working on James Gandolfini's final film left him disabled. He also contracted Lyme disease, for which he was treated with intravenous therapy for over a year. Edison's Children has been on hiatus ever since, though Armstrong is working with Edison's Children's back catalog for future releases.

Blackwood is the webmaster and photographer of the website Digitalballparks.com, and has authored and photographed for the top-selling book 500 Ballparks (Thunder Bay Press, Baker & Taylor) with his wife, photographer Wendy Farrell.

Discography

The Disturbance Fields (Edison's Children's 4th Album) - 2019  
Somewhere Between Here and There (Edison's Children's 3rd Album) - 2015
The Final Breath Before November (Edison's Children's 2nd Album) -2013
In The Last Waking Moments... (Edison's Children's 1st Album) - 2011
In The First Waking Moments... (The Making of "In The Last Waking Moments") (Edison's Children's Limited Edition of outtakes and demos from their first album) - 2012
A Million Miles Away (I Wish I Had A Time Machine) (EP Single featuring 4 new Edison's Children songs) - 2011
In The Last Waking Moments (Single EP featuring 1 new Edison's Children Song & 2 Live songs from Montreal and Amsterdam) -2012
DeStressed – Soundtrack from the movie -2013
Growing Down in Brooklyn – Soundtrack from the movie 
Approaching Indignation" (Sunblister's Album) - 1999
Simantik" (Sunblister's 1st Album) - 1996
"Haunted Memories" (Blackwood and Foti) - 1993

Feature films
As a special effects technician, on-set property technician and/or set dresser unless otherwise specified:

Spider-Man 3
American Gangster
Bourne Ultimatum
The Adjustment Bureau
I Am Legend
Men in Black 3
What Happens in Vegas
Baby Mama
Salt
Wanted
Percy Jackson and The Olympians: The Lightning Thief
Friends With Benefits
Violet and Daisy
The Drop
The Back-up Plan
Sherlock Holmes
Cop Out
Julie and Julia
For One More Day
World Trade Center
The Wrestler
Black Swan
The Taking of Pelham 1-2-3
The Other Guys
August Rush
Mr. Popper's Penguins
Perfect Stranger
Assassination of a High School President
A Walk Among The Tombstones
The Hoax
The Rebound

Television
As a special effects technician, on-set property technician and/or set dresser unless otherwise specified:

Person of Interest
Boardwalk Empire
Rescue Me
30 Rock
Smash
Law and Order: SVU
Law and Order: Criminal Intent
Law and Order: Trial By Jury
CSI: NY
Kings
White Collar
America's Next Top Model
New Amsterdam
Ugly Betty

Consultant
42: The Jackie Robinson Story (baseball stadium expert and locations advisor)

Music Director
DeStressed
Growing Down in Brooklyn

External links

References

1968 births
Living people
New Dorp High School alumni
American male singer-songwriters
People from Great Kills, Staten Island
Singer-songwriters from New York (state)